

Kurt Heyser (27 August 1894 – 20 April 1974) was a general in the Wehrmacht of Nazi Germany during World War II. He was a recipient of the Knight's Cross of the Iron Cross.

Awards and decorations

 Knight's Cross of the Iron Cross on 26 May 1940 as Oberst and commander of Infanterie-Regiment 47

Notes

References

 

1894 births
1974 deaths
Military personnel from Braunschweig
Major generals of the German Army (Wehrmacht)
German Army personnel of World War I
Recipients of the clasp to the Iron Cross, 1st class
Recipients of the Knight's Cross of the Iron Cross
People from the Duchy of Brunswick
German prisoners of war in World War II held by the United States